Roy Robert Edward Stanley is a British based entrepreneur and businessman, and chairman of two AIM listed companies, the Tanfield Group, makers of electric vehicles, and Optare, a bus manufacturer.

Stanley founded Tanfield in 1996 and developed it into the world's largest manufacturer of commercial electric vehicles The Stanley, County Durham based Tanfield Group is one of the leading employers in the North East of England 

In 2006 Stanley moved from Chief Executive to Chairman of Tanfield to concentrate on other ventures. In 2007 Stanley subsequently became founder and chairman of the Darwen Group, buying the former bus manufacturer East Lancashire Coachbuilders. With acquisitions and restructuring, by June 2008 Darwen had become the enlarged company Optare plc, employing 830 people and with a £90million turnover, with the goal of developing hybrid buses.

In April 2008 it was announced that Roy Stanley was to be the new Chairman of Business Link North East.

In July 2008 while still chairman, Stanley returned to the Tanfield Group in an executive role after a dramatic slump in the share price of Tanfield

Married with three children, Stanley holds an MBA from Newcastle University.

References

English businesspeople
Living people
Year of birth missing (living people)